Lyle J. Burbridge (died January 16, 2006) was an American sound engineer. He was nominated for an Academy Award in the category Best Sound for the film Rocky, and for a Primetime Emmy Award for sound mixing for the TV series Fame.

Selected filmography
 Rocky (1976)

References

External links

Year of birth missing
2006 deaths
American audio engineers
People from Seattle
20th-century American engineers